At the 1928 Summer Olympics in Amsterdam, a single modern pentathlon event was contested.

Participating nations
A total of 37 pentathletes (all men) from 14 nations competed at the Amsterdam Games:

Results
Source: Official results

References

External links
 

 
1928 Summer Olympics events
1928